The Saudi Payments Network or mada (formerly SPAN) is the only and major payment system in the kingdom of Saudi Arabia established by Ministry of Finance under the supervision of Saudi Central Bank. It connects all ATM and Point of Sale (PoS) terminals throughout the country to a central payment switch which in turn re-routes the financial transactions to the card issuer (local bank, Visa, American Express or MasterCard). All banks in Saudi Arabia are required by the Saudi Central Bank (SAMA) to issue ATM cards fully compatible with the network. All services are provided to the customer free of charge, regardless of the ATM used, its operator, or the customer's card issuer.

Mada provides its services through over than 17,000 ATM machines and over 225,000 POS terminals in the Kingdom. In cooperation with global payment systems such as Visa, MasterCard, and Maestro, mada allows access to millions of ATMs and POS terminals worldwide. 

The network has recently been upgraded to SPAN2 which is compliant with EMV standards and implements a higher capacity infrastructure and therefore less processing time, especially at POS terminals, resolving a major problem of the first generation SPAN system.

Member banks in the network 

 Al-Rajhi Bank
 Al Bilad Bank
 Arab National Bank
 Bank AlJazira
 Emirates International Bank
 National Commercial Bank
 Riyad Bank
 SABB
 AlAwal Bank
 Banque Saudi Fransi
 Saudi Investment Bank
 Samba Financial Group
 National Bank of Kuwait
 Bank Muscat
 National Bank of Bahrain
 Alinma Bank
 Gulf International Bank

See also
Smart card
Visa Inc.
American Express
MasterCard

References

External links
 SPAN home page

Banks of Saudi Arabia
Interbank networks
Payment networks